The men's pole vault at the 2006 European Athletics Championships were held at the Ullevi on August 10 and August 13.
Lobinger and Mesnil both claimed 2nd place, and therefore both received silver medals.

Medalists

Schedule

Results

Qualification
Qualification: Qualifying Performance 5.65 (Q) or at least 18 best performers (q) advance to the final. Competition was abandoned due to heavy rain. 20 athletes advanced to the final.

Final

External links
Results

Pole vault
Pole vault at the European Athletics Championships